The 2020 season was IFK Göteborg's 115th in existence, their 88th season in Allsvenskan and their 44th consecutive season in the league. They competed in Allsvenskan, Svenska Cupen and UEFA Europa League. League play started on 14 June and ended on 6 December.

Players

Squad

Club

Other information

Competitions

Overall

Allsvenskan

League table

Results summary

Results by round

Matches
Kickoff times are in UTC+2 unless stated otherwise.

Svenska Cupen

2019–20
The tournament continued from the 2019 season.

Kickoff times are in UTC+1 unless stated otherwise.

Group stage

Knockout stage

2020–21
The tournament continued into the 2021 season.

Qualification stage

UEFA Europa League

Qualifying phase and play-off round

Non competitive

Pre-season
Kickoff times are in UTC+1 unless stated otherwise.

Notes

References

IFK Göteborg seasons
IFK Goteborg